This is a chronological list of moveable Eastern Christian observances. Most of these are calculated by the date of Pascha. It includes secular observances which are calculated by religious observances.

This list does not necessarily imply either official status nor general observance.

2020 dates

February
11th Sunday before Pascha: February 2
Zacchaeus Sunday/Sunday of the Canaanite 
63 days before Pascha: February 8
Feast of Saint Sarkis (Armenian Apostolic Church)
10th Sunday before Pascha: February 9 
Publican & Pharisee Sunday 
Second Monday before Clean Monday: February 10–13 
Fast of Nineveh
9th Sunday before Pascha: February 16   
Sunday of the Prodigal Son
Thursday of the 8th week before Pascha: February 20  Feast of Saint Vartan (Armenian Apostolic Church)Sunday of Meatfare week: February 23 Sunday of Last Judgement (Meat Fare Sunday)Monday to Sunday following the 9th Sunday before Pascha: February 23-February 28  Meatfare Week Saturday of Meatfare Week: February 29 Saturday of Souls

MarchMonday to Sunday following Meatfare week: March 1–7 Cheesefare WeekSunday of Cheesefare week (Eastern Christianity): March 1Sunday of Forgiveness (Cheese-Fare Sunday)Monday after Sunday of Forgiveness: March 2 Great Lent begins
Clean MondayFirst Saturday of Great Lent: March 7  St. Theodore SaturdayFirst Sunday of Great Lent: March 8 Feast of Orthodoxy2nd Saturday of Lent: March 14 Saturday of Souls 5th Sunday before Pascha and 2nd Sunday of Lent: March 15 Sunday of St. Gregory Palamas3rd Saturday of Lent: March 21Saturday of Souls4th Saturday of Lent: March 28 Saturday of Souls4th Sunday before Pascha and 3rd Sunday of Lent: March 29 Sunday of the Holy Cross

April5th Saturday of Lent: April 4 Saturday of the Akathist3rd Sunday before Pascha and 4th Sunday of Lent: April 5Sunday of St. John Climacus Day before Palm Sunday: April 11 Lazarus Saturday
Lazareva Subota (Serbia)5th Sunday of Lent: April 12 Sunday of St. Mary of EgyptSunday before Pascha: April 12 
Palm Sunday
Flower's Day (Bulgaria)
Monday after Palm Sunday: April 13 
Great and Holy Monday  
Tuesday after Palm Sunday: April 14 
Great and Holy Tuesday
Wednesday after Palm Sunday: April 15 
Great and Holy Wednesday
Thursday after Palm Sunday: April 16 
Great and Holy Thursday 
Friday after Palm Sunday: April 17 
Great and Holy Friday
Saturday after Palm Sunday: April 18 
Great and Holy Saturday
April 19
Pascha
Fasika (Ethiopian Orthodox Tewahedo Church)
Pentecostarion begins. 
Monday after Pascha: April 20  
 Bright Monday
Sham el-Nessim (Egypt)
Tuesday after Pascha: April 21 
 Bright Tuesday
Wednesday after Pascha: April 22 
 Bright Wednesday
Thursday after Pascha: April 23 
 Bright Thursday
Friday after Pascha: April 24 
 Bright Friday
Saturday after Pascha: April 25 
 Bright Saturday
8th day after Pascha: April 26 
 Thomas Sunday
2nd Tuesday of Pascha, or 2nd Monday of Pascha, depending on region: April 27 
 Radonitsa (Russian Orthodox)

May
2nd Sunday following Pascha: May 3  
 Sunday of the Myrrhbearers
4th Sunday of Pascha: May 10 
 Sunday of the Paralytic
Wednesday after the Sunday of the Paralytic: May 13 
 Mid-Pentecost
5th Sunday of Pascha: May 17 
 Sunday of the Samaritan Woman
6th Sunday of Pascha: May 24  
 Sunday of the Blind Man
Forty days after Pascha: May 28 
 Feast of the Ascension 
Heroes Day (Romania)
7th Saturday of Pascha: May 30 
 Saturday of the Dead
7th Sunday of Pascha: May 31 
 Sunday of the Holy Fathers

June
Fifty days after Pascha: June 7 
 Pentecost
Trinity Sunday 
Monday after Pentecost: June 8 
 Monday of the Holy Spirit
Tuesday after Pentecost: June 9 
 Third Day of the Trinity
First Sunday after Pentecost: June 14 
 All Saints Sunday
64th day after Pascha: June 14  
 Feast of the Cathedral of Holy Etchmiadzin (Armenian Apostolic Church)
Second Monday after Pentecost, the day after All Saints' Sunday: July 15 
 Apostles' Fast

July
98 days/14 weeks after Pascha: July 19 
 Vardavar (Armenia)

August
Sunday closest to August 15: August 16 
Dormition of the Mother of God (Armenian Apostolic Church)

September
Saturday closest to Sept.23, the Conception of Saint John the Forerunner, Russian Orthodox only: September 20 
 Saturday of Souls

October
Saturday closest to October 26, feast day of Demetrius of Thessaloniki, Russian Orthodox only: October 25 
Demetrius Saturday

November
Sunday closest to November 11: November 14 
Remembrance Sunday (Cyprus only)

See also
List of movable Western Christian observances

References

External links
http://orthodoxwiki.org/Church_Calendar
http://www.goarch.org/chapel/calendar

Eastern Christian